Taraxacum is a large genus of flowering plants in the family Asteraceae, which consists of species commonly known as dandelions. The scientific and hobby study of the genus is known as taraxacology. The genus is native to Eurasia and North America, but the two most commonplace species worldwide, T. officinale (the common dandelion) and T. erythrospermum (the red-seeded dandelion), were introduced from Europe into North America, where they now propagate as wildflowers. Both species are edible in their entirety. The common name dandelion (from French , meaning 'lion's tooth') is also given to specific members of the genus.

Like other members of the family Asteraceae, they have very small flowers collected together into a composite flower head. Each single flower in a head is called a floret. In part due to their abundance, along with being a generalist species, dandelions are one of the most vital early spring nectar sources for a wide host of pollinators. Many Taraxacum species produce seeds asexually by apomixis, where the seeds are produced without pollination, resulting in offspring that are genetically identical to the parent plant.

The flower heads are yellow to orange coloured, and are open in the daytime, but closed at night. The heads are borne singly on a hollow stem (scape) that is usually leafless and rises  or more above the leaves. Stems and leaves exude a white, milky latex when broken. A rosette may produce several flowering stems at a time. The flower heads mature into spherical seed heads sometimes called blowballs or clocks (in both British and American English) containing many single-seeded fruits called achenes. Each achene is attached to a pappus of fine hair-like material which enables wind-aided dispersal over long distances.

The flower head is surrounded by bracts (sometimes mistakenly called sepals) in two series. The inner bracts are erect until the seeds mature, then flex downward to allow the seeds to disperse. The outer bracts are often reflexed downward, but remain appressed in plants of the sections Palustria and Spectabilia.  Between the pappus and the achene is a stalk called a beak, which elongates as the fruit matures. The beak breaks off from the achene quite easily, separating the seed from the parachute.

Description

The species of Taraxacum are tap-rooted, perennial, herbaceous plants, native to temperate areas of the Northern Hemisphere. The genus contains many species, which usually (or in the case of triploids, obligately) reproduce by apomixis, resulting in many local populations and endemism. In the British Isles alone, 234 microspecies (i.e. morphologically distinct clonal populations) are recognised in nine loosely defined sections, of which 40 are "probably endemic". A number of species of Taraxacum are seed-dispersed ruderals that rapidly colonize disturbed soil, especially the common dandelion (T. officinale), which has been introduced over much of the temperate world. After flowering is finished, the dandelion flower head dries out for a day or two. The dried petals and stamens drop off, the bracts reflex (curve backwards), and the parachute ball opens into a full sphere. When development is complete, the mature seeds are attached to white, fluffy "parachutes" which easily detach from the seedhead and glide by wind, dispersing.

The seeds are able to cover large distances when dispersed due to the unique morphology of the pappus which works to create a unique type of vortex ring that stays attached to the seed rather than being sent downstream. In addition to the creation of this vortex ring, the pappus can adjust its morphology depending on the moisture in the air. This allows the plume of seeds to close up and reduce the chance to separate from the stem, waiting for optimal conditions that will maximize dispersal and germination.

Similar plants

Many similar plants in the family Asteraceae with yellow flowers are sometimes known as false dandelions. Dandelion flowers are very similar to those of cat's ears (Hypochaeris). Both plants carry similar flowers, which form into windborne seeds. However, dandelion flowers are borne singly on unbranched, hairless and leafless, hollow stems, while cat's ear flowering stems are branched, solid, and carry bracts. Both plants have a basal rosette of leaves and a central taproot. However, the leaves of dandelions are smooth or glabrous, whereas those of cat's ears are coarsely hairy.

Early-flowering dandelions may be distinguished from coltsfoot (Tussilago farfara) by their basal rosette of leaves, their lack of disc florets, and the absence of scales on the flowering stem.

Other plants with superficially similar flowers include hawkweeds (Hieracium) and hawksbeards (Crepis). These are readily distinguished by branched flowering stems, which are usually hairy and bear leaves.

Classification
The genus is taxonomically complex due to the presence of apomixis: any morphologically distinct clonal population would deserve its own microspecies. Phylogenetic approaches are also complicated by the accelerated mutation in apomixic lines and repeated ancient hybridization events in the genus.

As of 1970, the group is divided into about 34 macrospecies or sections, and about 2000 microspecies; some botanists take a much narrower view and only accept a total of about 60 (macro)species. By 2015, the number has been revised to include 60 sections and about 2800 microspecies. 30 of these sections are known to reproduce sexually.

About 235 apomictic and polyploid microspecies have been recorded in Great Britain and Ireland alone.

Selected species
 Taraxacum albidum, the white-flowered Japanese dandelion, a hybrid between T. coreanum and T. japonicum
 Taraxacum aphrogenes, the Paphos dandelion
 Taraxacum arcticum
 Taraxacum balticum
 Taraxacum brachyceras
 Taraxacum brevicorniculatum, frequently misidentified as T. kok-saghyz and a poor rubber producer
 Taraxacum californicum, the California dandelion, an endangered species
 Taraxacum centrasiaticum, the Xinjiang dandelion
 Taraxacum ceratophorum, the horned dandelion, considered by some sources to be a North American subspecies of T. officinale (T. officinale subsp. ceratophorum)
 Taraxacum coreanum
 Taraxacum desertorum
 Taraxacum erythrospermum, the red-seeded dandelion, often considered a variety of T. laevigatum (i.e., T. laevigatum var. erythrospermum)
 Taraxacum farinosum, the Turkish dandelion
 Taraxacum holmboei, the Troödos dandelion
 Taraxacum hybernum
 Taraxacum japonicum, the Japanese dandelion, no ring of smallish, downward-turned leaves under the flower head
 Taraxacum kok-saghyz, the Kazakh dandelion, which produces rubber
 Taraxacum laevigatum, the rock dandelion, achenes reddish brown and leaves deeply cut throughout the length, inner bracts' tips are hooded
 Taraxacum lissocarpum
 Taraxacum minimum
 Taraxacum mirabile
 Taraxacum officinale (syn. T. officinale subsp. vulgare), the common dandelion, found in many forms
 Taraxacum pankhurstianum, the St. Kilda dandelion
 Taraxacum platycarpum, the Korean dandelion
 Taraxacum pseudoroseum
 Taraxacum suecicum

Cultivars
'Amélioré à Coeur Plein' yields an abundant crop without taking up much ground, and tends to blanch itself naturally, due to its clumping growth habit.
'Broad-leaved' - The leaves are thick and tender and easily blanched. In rich soils, they can be up to 60 cm (2') wide. Plants do not go to seed as quickly as French types.
'Vert de Montmagny' is a large-leaved, vigorous grower, which matures early.

History

Dandelions are thought to have evolved about 30 million years ago in Eurasia. Fossil seeds of Taraxacum tanaiticum have been recorded from the Pliocene of southern Belarus. Dandelions have been used by humans for food and as an herb for much of recorded history. They were well known to ancient Egyptians, Greeks and Romans, and are recorded to have been used in traditional Chinese medicine for over a thousand years. The plant was used as food and medicine by Native Americans. Dandelions were probably brought to North America on the Mayflower for their supposed medicinal benefits.

Etymology

The Latin name Taraxacum originates in medieval Arabic writings on pharmacy. The scientist Al-Razi around 900 CE wrote "the tarashaquq is like chicory". The scientist and philosopher Ibn Sīnā around 1000 CE wrote a book chapter on Taraxacum. Gerard of Cremona, in translating Arabic to Latin around 1170, spelled it tarasacon.

Common names
The English name, dandelion, is a corruption of the French dent de lion meaning "lion's tooth", referring to the coarsely toothed leaves. The plant is also known as blowball, cankerwort, doon-head-clock, witch's gowan, milk witch, lion's-tooth, yellow-gowan, Irish daisy, monks-head, priest's-crown, and puff-ball; other common names include faceclock, pee-a-bed, wet-a-bed,
swine's snout, white endive, and wild endive.

The English folk name "piss-a-bed" (and indeed the equivalent contemporary French ) refers to the strong diuretic effect of the plant's roots. In various northeastern Italian dialects, the plant is known as pisacan ("dog pisses"), because they are found at the side of pavements. In Swedish, it is called maskros (worm rose) after the small insects (thrips) usually present in the flowers.

Nutrition

Raw dandelion greens contain high amounts of vitamins A, C, and K, and are moderate sources of calcium, potassium, iron, and manganese. Raw dandelion greens are 86% water, 9% carbohydrates, 3% protein, and 1% fat. A 100 gram (oz) reference amount supplies 45 Calories.

Phytochemicals
The raw flowers contain diverse phytochemicals, including polyphenols, such as flavonoids apigenin, isoquercitrin (a quercetin-like compound), and caffeic acid, as well as terpenoids, triterpenes, and sesquiterpenes. The roots contain a substantial amount of the prebiotic fiber inulin. Dandelion greens contain lutein.

Taraxalisin, a serine proteinase, is found in the latex of dandelion roots. Maximal activity of the proteinase in the roots is attained in April, at the beginning of plant development after the winter period. Each dandelion seed has a mass(weight) of 500 micrograms or 0.0005g (1/125 of a grain).

Properties

Edibility

The entire plant, including the leaves, stems, flowers, and roots, is edible and nutritious, with nutrients such as vitamins A and K as well as calcium and iron.
 Dandelions are found on six continents and have been gathered for food since prehistory, but the varieties commercially cultivated for consumption are mainly native to Eurasia and North America. A perennial plant, its leaves grow back if the taproot is left intact. To make leaves more palatable, they are often blanched to remove bitterness, or sauteed in the same way as spinach. Dandelion greens have been a part of traditional Kashmiri cuisine, Spanish cuisine, Italian cuisine, Albanian cuisine, Slovenian, Sephardic Jewish, Chinese, Greek cuisine and Korean cuisines. In Crete, the leaves of a variety called 'Mari', 'Mariaki', or 'Koproradiko' are eaten by locals, either raw or boiled, in salads.

The flower petals, along with other ingredients, usually including citrus, are used to make dandelion wine. Its ground, roasted roots can be used as a caffeine-free coffee alternative. Dandelion was also traditionally used to make the traditional British soft drink dandelion and burdock, and is one of the ingredients of root beer. Dandelions were once considered delicacies by the Victorian gentry, who used them mostly in salads and sandwiches.

Dye
The yellow flowers can be dried and ground into a yellow-pigmented powder and used as a dye.

Allergies
Dandelion pollen may cause allergic reactions when eaten, or adverse skin reactions in sensitive individuals. Contact dermatitis after handling has also been reported, probably from the latex in the stems and leaves.

Herbalism
Dandelion has been used in traditional medicine in Europe, North America, and China.

Food for wildlife

Seeds
Taraxacum seeds are an important food source for certain birds (linnets, Linaria spp.).

Nectar

Szabo studied nectar secretion in a dandelion patch over two years ( in 1981 and 1982). He measured average nectar volume at 7.4 μl/flower in 1981 and 3.7 μl/flower in 1982. The flowers tended to open in the morning and close in the afternoon with the concentrations significantly higher on the second day.

Dandelions are also important plants for Northern Hemisphere bees, providing an important source of nectar and pollen early in the season. They are also used as a source of nectar by the pearl-bordered fritillary (Boloria euphrosyne), one of the earliest emerging butterflies in the spring.

Leaves
Dandelions are used as food plants by the larvae of some species of Lepidoptera (butterflies and moths).

Invasive species

Dandelions can cause significant economic damage as an invasive species and infestation of other crops worldwide; in some jurisdictions, the species T. officinale is listed as a noxious weed. It can also be considered invasive in protected areas such as national parks. For example, Denali National Park and Preserve in Alaska lists Taraxacum officinale as the most common invasive species in the park  and hosts an annual "Dandelion Demolition" event where volunteers are trained to remove the plant from the park's roadsides.

Benefits to gardeners

With a wide range of uses, the dandelion is cultivated in small gardens to massive farms. It is kept as a companion plant; its taproot brings up nutrients for shallow-rooting plants. It is also known to attract pollinating insects and release ethylene gas, which helps fruit to ripen.

Cultural importance
It has been a Western tradition for someone to blow out a dandelion seedhead and think of a wish they want to come true.

Five dandelion flowers are the emblem of White Sulphur Springs, West Virginia. The citizens celebrate spring with an annual Dandelion Festival.

The dandelion is the official flower of the University of Rochester in New York State, and "Dandelion Yellow" is one of the school's official colors. "The Dandelion Yellow" is an official University of Rochester song.

Inspiration for engineering 
The ability of dandelion seeds to travel as far as a kilometer in dry, windy and warm conditions, has been an inspiration for designing light-weight passive drones.

In 2018, researchers discovered that dandelion seeds have a separated vortex ring. This work provided evidence that dandelion seeds have fluid behavior around fluid-immersed bodies that may help understand locomotion, weight reduction and particle retention in biological and man-made structures.

In 2022, researchers at the University of Washington demonstrated battery-free wireless sensors and computers that mimic dandelion seeds and can float in the wind and disperse across a large area.

As a source of natural rubber

Dandelions secrete latex when the tissues are cut or broken, yet in the wild type, the latex content is low and varies greatly. Taraxacum kok-saghyz, the Russian dandelion, is a species that produced industrially useful amounts during WW2. Using modern cultivation methods and optimization techniques, scientists in the Fraunhofer Institute for Molecular Biology and Applied Ecology (IME) in Germany developed a cultivar of the Russian dandelion that is suitable for current commercial production of natural rubber. The latex produced exhibits the same quality as the natural rubber from rubber trees. In collaboration with Continental AG, IME is building a pilot facility. , the first prototype test tires made with blends from dandelion-rubber are scheduled for testing on public roads over the next few years. In December 2017, Linglong Group Co. Ltd., a Chinese company, invested $450 million into making commercially viable rubber from dandelions.

References

External links

 
Asteraceae genera
Herbs
Leaf vegetables
Medicinal plants
Melliferous flowers
Extant Miocene first appearances